In mathematics, specifically the field of abstract algebra, Bergman's Diamond Lemma (after George Bergman) is a method for confirming whether a given set of monomials of an algebra forms a -basis. It is an extension of Gröbner bases to non-commutative rings. The proof of the lemma gives rise to an algorithm for obtaining a non-commutative Gröbner basis of the algebra from its defining relations. However, in contrast to Buchberger's algorithm, in the non-commutative case, this algorithm may not terminate.

Preliminaries 
Let  be a commutative associative ring with identity element 1, usually a field. Take an arbitrary set  of variables. In the finite case one usually has . Elements of  will be called words, since elements of  can be seen as letters.

Monomial Ordering 

This has to be a total order and satisfy the following:

 For each word , the collection  is finite.

We call such an order admissible. Then the above rule implies that the monomials are ordered in the following way:

Reduction 
Then we may scale each  such that its leading word  has coefficient 1. Thus we can write , where  is a linear combination of words  such that . A word  is called reduced with respect to the relations  if it does not contain any of the leading words . By the choice of ordering there are only finitely many words less than any given word, hence a finite composition of reductions will send any  to a linear combination of reduced words.

Any element shares an equivalence class modulo  with its reduced form. Thus the canonical images of the reduced words in  form a -spanning set. Bergman's Diamond Lemma lets us verify if a set of generators  has this property. Moreover, in the case where it does not have this property, the proof of Bergman's Diamond Lemma leads to an algorithm for extending the set of generators to one that does.

In other words, if we apply reductions to transform an element into a linear combination of reduced words in two different ways, we obtain the same result.

Ambiguities 
When performing reductions there might not always be an obvious choice for which reduction to do. This is called an ambiguity and there are two types which may arise. This ambiguity is resolvable if   and  can be reduced to a common expression using compositions of reductions.

Secondly, one leading word may be contained in another i.e.  for some words  and some indices . Then we have an inclusion ambiguity.

Statement of the Lemma 
The statement of the lemma is simple but involves the terminology defined above. This lemma is applicable as long as the underlying ring is associative.

Then the following are equivalent:

 The images of the reduced words in  form a -basis.

Given a set of generators, one usually checks the first or second condition to confirm that the set is a -basis.

Examples

Resolving ambiguities 
Take , which is the quantum polynomial ring in 3 variables, and assume . One may resolve via  or via  first. The first option gives us the following chain of reductions,

whereas the second possibility gives,

Since  are commutative the above are equal.

Non-resolving ambiguities 
Let . Let us consider . If we resolve  first we get,

which contains no leading words and is therefore reduced. Resolving  first we obtain,

Since both of the above are reduced but not equal we see that the ambiguity does not resolve. Hence  is not a Gröbner basis for the ideal it generates.

Algorithm 
The following short algorithm follows from the proof of Bergman's Diamond Lemma. It is based on adding new relations which resolve previously unresolvable ambiguities. Suppose that  is an overlap ambiguity which does not resolve. Therefore, we obtain a new non-zero relation . The leading word of this relation is necessarily different from the leading words of existing relations. The process is analogous for inclusion ambiguities.

Now, the previously unresolvable overlap ambiguity resolves by construction of the new relation. However, new ambiguities may arise. This process may terminate after a finite number of iterations producing a Gröbner basis for the ideal or never terminate. The infinite set of relations produced in the case where the algorithm never terminates is still a Gröbner basis, but it may not be useful unless a pattern in the new relations can be found.

Example 
Let us continue with the example from above where . We found that the overlap ambiguity  does not resolve. Hence we do not need to scale it and can add it to our set of relations which is now . Adding the new relation did not add any ambiguities so we are left with the overlap ambiguity  we identified above. Let us try and resolve it with the relations we currently have. Again, resolving  first we obtain,

On the other hand resolving  twice first and then  we find,

Since the coefficient of the leading word is -1 we scale the relation and then add  to the set of defining relations. Now all ambiguities resolve and Bergman's Diamond Lemma implies that

 is a Gröbner basis for the ideal it defines.

Further generalisations 
The importance of the diamond lemma can be seen by how many other mathematical structures it has been adapted for:

 For power series algebras.
For certain quiver Hecke algebras.
For category algebras.
For small categories.
For shuffle operads.

The lemma has been used to prove the Poincaré–Birkhoff–Witt theorem.

References 

Lemmas in algebra